Daentl Townsend Siegel syndrome is a very rare disorder characterized by blue sclerae, kidney malfunction, thin skin, and hydrocephalus. It was first identified by D.L. Daentl et al. in 1978. Daentl Townsend Siegel syndrome is also known as "Hydrocephalus blue sclera nephropathy" and "Familial nephrosis, hydrocephalus, thin skin, blue sclerae syndrome".

References

External links 

Rare syndromes
Syndromes affecting the eye
Syndromes affecting the kidneys
Syndromes affecting the skin
Syndromes affecting the nervous system